Vicianose is a disaccharide.

Vicianin is a cyanogenic glycoside containing vicianose. The enzyme vicianin beta-glucosidase uses (R)-vicianin and water to produce mandelonitrile and vicianose.

The fruits of Viburnum dentatum appear blue. One of the major pigments is cyanidin 3-vicianoside, but the total mixture is very complex.

References 

Disaccharides